The World as I See It is a book by Albert Einstein translated from the German by A. Harris and published in 1935 by John Lane The Bodley Head (London). The original German book is Mein Weltbild by Albert Einstein, first published in 1934 by Rudolf Kayser, with an essential extended edition published by Carl Seelig in 1954. Composed of assorted articles, addresses, letters, interviews and pronouncements, it includes Einstein's opinions on the meaning of life, ethics, science, society, religion, and politics.

According to the preface of the first English edition,

References

External links 
The World as I See It preview on Google Books
Essay "The World as I See It"
Essay "Religion and Science"
 

Works by Albert Einstein
1934 non-fiction books